Ludwig Piskaçek (16 November 1854, Karcag, Hungary – 19 September 1932, Vienna) was an Austrian obstetrician remembered for describing Piskaçek's sign.

He trained in Vienna, gaining his doctorate in 1882. He became apprentice in surgery at the Albert Clinic until 1884, then assistant at the second obstetrical clinic under Josef Späth (1823–1896) and his successor August Breisky (1832–1889) until 1888. He became professor of obstetrics in Linz in 1890, and in Vienna in 1901.

He was the author of a textbook on midwifery that was published over several editions, Lehrbuch für Schülerinnen des Hebammenkurses und Nachschlagebuch für Hebammen.

References

External links 

Austrian gynaecologists
1854 births
1932 deaths
People from Karcag
Academic staff of the University of Vienna